Karian (Karen), also called Bilakura, is a nearly extinct Papuan language of Madang Province, Papua New Guinea. Is is spoken in Boia and Barto villages. Some speakers also live in Malas, a Manep-speaking village.

References

Numagen languages
Languages of Madang Province
Endangered Papuan languages
Critically endangered languages